China Airlines Flight 676 was a scheduled international passenger flight. On Monday, 16 February 1998, the Airbus A300 jet airliner operating the flight crashed into a road and residential area in Tayuan, Taoyuan County (now Taoyuan City), near Chiang Kai-shek International Airport (present-day Taoyuan International Airport), Taiwan.

The A300,  registered as B-1814, was en route from Ngurah Rai Airport in Bali, Indonesia to Taipei, Taiwan. The weather was inclement, with rain and fog when the aircraft approached Chiang Kai-shek International Airport, so the pilot executed a missed approach. After the jet was cleared to land at runway 05L, the autopilot was disengaged, and the pilots then attempted a manual go-around. The jet slowed, pitched up by 40°, rose , stalled, and crashed into a residential neighborhood, bursting into flames at local time 4:20 pm. All 196 people on board were killed (including the governor of Taiwan's central bank, Sheu Yuan-dong, his wife, and three central bank officials), along with seven people on the ground. Hsu Lu, the manager of the Voice of Taipei radio station, said that one boy was pulled alive from the wreckage and later died.

It remains the deadliest aviation accident on Taiwanese soil. China Airlines had 12 A300s in its fleet at the time of the accident.

Aircraft and crew

The aircraft involved in the accident was an Airbus A300B4-622R, registration  It was delivered to China Airlines on 14 December 1990 and was powered by two Pratt and Whitney PW4156 engines. The aircraft was 7.3 years old at the time of the accident, and had completed 20,193 flight hours. The flight was flown by Captain Kang Long-Lin, 49, who joined China Airlines in 1990, and had 7,226 hours total flight time (2,382 of them on the Airbus A300) and First Officer Jiang Der-Sheng, 44, joined China Airlines in 1996, and had 3,550 hours total flight time (304 of them on the Airbus A300). Both pilots were formerly with the Republic of China Air Force. The flight consisted of 175 Taiwanese nationals, along with five Americans, one French, and one Indonesian.

Accident
The plane took off from Ngurah Rai Int'l Airport, Bali, en route to Chiang Kai-Shek International Airport, Taipei, Taiwan, with 182 passengers and 14 crew at 15:27.

Go-around power was applied 19 seconds later, and the landing gear was raised and the flaps set to 20° as the aircraft climbed through  in a 35° pitch-up angle.

Reaching  (42.7° pitch-up,  speed), the A300 stalled. Control could not be regained, as the aircraft fell and smashed into the ground  left of the runway. It then surged forward, hit a utility pole and a median strip of Provincial Highway 15 and skidded into several houses, surrounded by fish farms, rice paddies, factories, and warehouses, and exploded, killing all on board.

According to the cockpit voice recorder, the last words, from the first officer, were "Pull up, too low!" This was surrounded by the terrain alarm and stall warnings.

Investigation and conclusion
On initial approach to land, the aircraft was more than 300 m above its normal altitude when it was only 6 nautical miles away from the airport. Nonetheless, it continued the approach. Only when approaching the runway threshold was a go-around initiated. During this time, the pilot had pushed the yoke forward and the plane's autopilot was disengaged, but was not aware of it, so during the go-around, he did nothing to actively take control of the plane, as he thought the autopilot would initiate the maneuver. For 11 seconds, the plane was under no one's control.

Following a formal investigation that had continued for nearly 2 years, a final report by a special task force under the Civil Aviation Administration concluded that pilot error was the cause of the crash of Flight 676. The report concludes by criticizing China Airlines for "insufficient training" and "poor management of the resources in the pilot's cabin".

Transcript

The transcript of the cockpit voice recording was leaked on the Internet, but has been removed as it is a property of the Taiwanese government.

The person speaking is listed in bold.

 TWR - Chiang Kai-shek International Airport control tower
 F/O - First officer on board CI676
 Capt - Captain on board CI676
GPWS - Ground proximity warning system (aircraft system)
CAM - Cockpit area microphone where sound of cockpit environment can be recorded by the cockpit voice recorder (CVR), includes descriptors of various unidentified sounds picked up by the CAM, including the GPWS
 CAL - Unknown, may be intended to mean CI (China Air Lines) 676 First Officer

12:04:26 TWR Clear to land. Wind 360 at 3.

12:04:27 F/O Roger. Clear to land. Dynasty 676.

12:04:32 F/O OK. Glide Slope blue. Localiser green.

12:04:41 Capt It's 1,000 feet higher.

12:04:51 Capt It's coming. 1,000 feet.

12:04:54 Capt OK. Thirty forty.

12:04:55 F/O Thirty forty.

12:05:01 F/O Landing gear.

12:05:02 F/O Three green.

12:05:03 Capt Anti-skid

12:05:03 F/O Normal and... 

12:05:05 Capt Slat flap.

12:05:05 F/O Thirty forty.

12:05:06 Capt Spoiler.

12:05:07 CAM [Sound of autopilot disconnect warning]

12:05:08 F/O Armed

12:05:09 Capt Landing light

12:05:10 F/O On

12:05:11 CAM [Sound of triple click (indicates landing capability category change)]

12:05:12 Capt OK, Landing check list complete

12:05:13 Capt GO lever, go around

12:05:14 F/O Go around, GO lever

12:05:16 CAM [Sound of triple click]

12:05:18 Capt Positive gears up

12:05:19 F/O Gears down?

12:05:20 Capt Gear up!

12:05:20 F/O Gear up

12:05:22 F/O Heading select, plus

12:05:22 F/O Plus ten

12:05:24 CAM [Sound of gear retraction]

12:05:24 Capt Flaps

12:05:24 CAM [Sound of selector]

12:05:26 CAM [Sound of continuous repetitive chime (master warning)]

12:05:32 CAM [Sound of altitude alert]

12:05:32 CAM [Sound of selector]

12:05:33 CAM [Sound of whooler (pitch trim movement)]

12:05:34 CAM [Sound of selector]

12:05:36 CAM [Sound of stall warning]

12:05:37 CAL 676 (F/O)	Tower, Dynasty

12:05:38 CAM [Sound of altitude alert]

12:05:40 CAM [Sound of single chime]

12:05:42 Capt Aio

12:05:43 CAM [Sound of single chime]

12:05:45 Capt Aio

12:05:44 CAM [Sound of single chime]

12:05:45 TWR Dynasty 676, confirm go around?

12:05:47 CAM [Sound of altitude alert]

12:05:48 CAL 676 (F/O)	Confirm go around

12:05:49 GPWS Terrain

12:05:50 F/O Pull up, altitude low

12:05:51 GPWS Whoop, whoop, pull up

12:05:52 CAM [Sound of autopilot disconnect warning]

12:05:53 GPWS Whoop, whoop, pull up

12:05:56 GPWS Whoop, whoop, pull up

12:05:56 CAM [Sound of autopilot disconnect warning]

12:05:57 End of recording

Aftermath
After the accident, China Airlines flight number 676 was retired and changed to flight 772; it was still operated by the Airbus A300 until they were replaced by Airbus A330 aircraft.

The A300 was in the fleet of China Airlines until 2006, when it was replaced by the Airbus A330-300 and Boeing 747-400 aircraft.

See also

 China Airlines Flight 140, another crash involving a CAL Airbus A300 during the 1990s, which also occurred on final approach
 Flydubai Flight 981
 2021 Piedade de Caratinga Beechcraft King Air crash
 List of accidents and incidents involving commercial aircraft

References

External links

The Crash of Flight CI676, a China Airlines Airbus A300, Taipei, Taiwan, Monday 16 February, 1998: What We Know So Far (Archive) – University of Bielefeld
 CVR Transcript of Flight 676

Aviation accidents and incidents in 1998
Airliner accidents and incidents caused by weather
Airliner accidents and incidents caused by pilot error
Aviation accidents and incidents in Taiwan
Airliner accidents and incidents involving fog
Accidents and incidents involving the Airbus A300
676
1998 in Taiwan
February 1998 events in Asia
1998 meteorology
Airliner accidents and incidents caused by stalls
1998 disasters in Taiwan